David Franj (born 23 September 1975) is the performance name of David Frangiosa (also seen as David Franciosa), who is an Australian singer-songwriter-author. Frangiosa had three singles on the ARIA Singles Chart top 40: "Oxygen" (March 2002), "Never Be Amazing" (August) and "God Only Knows" (February 2003). All appeared on his debut album, Wrong Place, Wrong Time (March 2003), which reached the ARIA Albums Chart top 60.

He co-wrote the song "Perfect" (April 2008) with its performer, Vanessa Amorosi, which reached No. 4 on the ARIA Charts and is certified double platinum. It was nominated as the Most Played Australian Work at the APRA Music Awards of 2009.

Biography 
David Franj, was born as David Frangiosa, and was raised in Melbourne.

2003: Solo career
Franj's first single, "Oxygen", was released to radio in early 2002 and peaked at No. 25 on the ARIA Singles Chart in April. It was followed by "Never Be Amazing", which reached the Top 40 in August. His third single, "God Only Knows", also reached the top 40, in February 2003. His debut album, Wrong Place, Wrong Time, reached No. 53 on the ARIA Albums Chart.

In December 2003 Franj provided "I Want to Wake Up with You" for the soundtrack for the Australian comedy film, The Wannabes.

Writing career
Vanessa Amorosi released "Perfect" in April 2008, the second single from her second studio album, Somewhere in the Real World. It was co-written by Franj with Amorosi and peaked at No. 4. By the end of that year it was certified platinum for shipment of 70,000 units. At the APRA Music Awards of 2009 "Perfect" was nominated for Most Played Australian Work.

Discography

Albums

Singles

Awards and nominations

APRA Awards
The APRA Awards have been presented annually from 1982 by the Australasian Performing Right Association (APRA), "honouring composers and songwriters".

|-
| 2009
| Most Played Australian Work
| "Perfect" (Vanessa Amorosi, David Franciosa)
| 
|-

References

1975 births
Australian singer-songwriters
Living people
21st-century Australian singers